The Karoo dwarf chameleon (Bradypodion karrooicum) is a chameleon native to South Africa. It is about 14 cm (6 in) long, mostly colored grey and brown, sometimes olive. The thin skin around the throat is yellow, and it has conical scales along the spine.

It inhabits rather dry habitat on the border between the Great and Little Karoo of eastern Northern Cape and western Free State provinces, South Africa.

This animal is occasionally considered a subspecies of the Cape dwarf chameleon (e.g. Klaver & Böhme 1997), but among the South African dwarf chameleons, these two are by no means closely related. Rather, the Karoo dwarf chameleon belongs to a group of mostly short-tailed drab Bradypodion species which mostly inhabit semiarid to arid habitats. Its closest living relatives among these appear to be the peculiar and nearly extinct Smith's dwarf chameleon from mountainous habitat, and especially the southern dwarf chameleon. The Karoo dwarf chameleon may actually be a subspecies of the latter; there appears to be significant gene flow between the two.

References

  (1997): Liste der rezenten Amphibien und Reptilien - Chamaeleonidae. Das Tierreich 112: i-xiv, 1-85.

External links
 Search for Distribution of Bradypodion karrooicum

Bradypodion
Reptiles of South Africa
Reptiles described in 1915
Taxa named by John Hewitt (herpetologist)